Gianni De Fraja is a professor of economics at the University of Nottingham, England and a Research Fellow (CEPR).

He was born in Bologna, where he spent the first five years of his life, before moving to Bassano del Grappa and then on to Mestre, near Venice, where  he lived until he was eighteen. He attended SSSUP college in Pisa from which he graduated in 1982. He then moved to a house near the Chianti Hills near Vagliagli where he took his doctorate at Siena with a thesis on Game Theory.

After a year in Siena he was encouraged by his teachers to go abroad and so went to England, to Linacre College, Oxford. After two years in Oxford he returned to Italy for military service in the Italian Army. After a year he returned to complete his thesis on oligopolistic competition.

Since finishing his studies in Oxford he has taken up academic positions in the universities of Leicester, Bristol and York. He has also been on academic trips to Tokyo, Bonn and Barcelona. After thirteen years in York, he is now settled in Leicester, with two daughters and a son.

Between 1999 and 2005, he was Managing Editor of the Bulletin of Economic Research. His research interests are in the areas of Public economics, Economics of education, Regulation, and Game Theory. He has published papers in, among others, Journal of Public Economics, International Economic Review, Review of Economic Studies, Economic Journal, Journal of Political Economy, and Oxford Economic Papers. As posted on his personal webpage , he considers himself a bright.

He has been elected head of the Department of Economics at the University of Leicester and will begin his mandate in September 2008. In 2011 he was replaced as head of department by Stephen Hall.

References

Academics of the University of Bristol
Academics of the University of York
Italian emigrants to the United Kingdom
University of Siena alumni
Alumni of Linacre College, Oxford
Academics of the University of Leicester
Living people
1960 births
Education economists